In gridiron football, a sack occurs when the quarterback (or another offensive player acting as a passer) is tackled behind the line of scrimmage before throwing a forward pass, when the quarterback is tackled behind the line of scrimmage in the "pocket" and without clear intent, or when a passer runs out of bounds behind the line of scrimmage due to defensive pressure. This often occurs if the opposing team's defensive line, linebackers or defensive backs are able to apply pass pressure (also called a pass rush) to quickly get past blocking players of the offensive team (the quarterback's protection), or if the quarterback is unable to find a back to hand the ball off to or an available eligible receiver (including wide receivers, running backs and tight ends) to catch the ball, allowing the defense a longer opportunity to tackle the quarterback. 

Performing a sack is advantageous for the defending team as the offense loses a down, and the line of scrimmage retreats several yards. Even better for the defense is a sack causing the quarterback to fumble the ball at or behind the line of scrimmage; this is also known as a strip sack and can result in a turnover if the defense manages to obtain the ball. A quarterback who is pressured but avoids a sack can still be adversely affected by being forced to hurry.

The quarterback must pass the statistical line of scrimmage to avoid the sack. If a passer is sacked in his own end zone, the result is a safety and the defending team is awarded two points, unless the football is fumbled and recovered either in the end zone by the defense, or outside the end zone in which would be resulted in a touchdown for the defense.

Statistical record rules

To be considered a sack, the quarterback must intend to throw a forward pass. If the play is designed for the quarterback to rush (run) the ball, any loss is subtracted from the quarterback's rushing total (and the play is ruled a tackle for loss as opposed to a sack). If the quarterback's intent is not obvious, statisticians use certain criteria, such as the offensive line blocking scheme, to decide. Unique situations where a loss reduces a quarterback's rushing total (not a sack) are "kneel downs" (used to run time off the game clock).

A player will receive credit for half of a sack when multiple players contribute to the sacking of a quarterback, even if more than two players contributed.

In the National Football League (NFL), it is possible to record a sack for zero yards. The NFL subtract yards lost due to sacks from teams' passing totals (though the quarterback's individual passing total stats remain unchanged), while the NCAA subtracts sack yardage from individual rushing totals.

History

The term "sack" was first popularized in the 1960s by Hall of Fame defensive end Deacon Jones, who felt that a quarterback being sacked devastated the offense in the same way that a city was devastated when it was sacked. In 1999, Jones provided a Los Angeles Times reporter with some other detailed imagery about his forte: "You take all the offensive linemen and put them in a burlap bag, and then you take a baseball bat and beat on the bag. You're sacking them, you're bagging them. And that’s what you're doing with a quarterback."

According to former NFL coach Marv Levy, Washington Redskins coach George Allen may have coined the term when referring to Dallas Cowboys quarterback Craig Morton when he purportedly stated before a game, "Before we play those Dallas Cowboys, we’re going to take that Morton salt and pour him into a sack."

Prior to "sack", the term "dump" was often used, as the NFL's statistical office recorded all sacks under "dumping the passer".

The NFL only began to keep track of times passers lost yardage in 1961 and no credit was given to the defensive player responsible until 1982. Researcher John Turney of the Pro Football Researchers Association estimated that Jones recorded 173½ sacks in his career.

Controversial NFL rule changes made for the 2018 season prohibit tacklers from landing on the quarterback after making a sack, with the punishment being a roughing the passer penalty.

Pass pressure

Of all forms of defensive pressure against the opposition's passer, sacks provide the most immediate impact by ending the offensive play. However, quarterbacks sometimes avoid a sack by throwing an incomplete pass or risking an interception. According to Football Outsiders, a quarterback hurry is the most common form of pass pressure. In the 2009 NFL season, there were 1,106 sacks and 3,268 hurries, and a hurried quarterback generally averaged fewer yards per pass play compared to the average pass play.

NFL records 
These records are from 1982 onwards, the year the NFL started officially recording sacks.
 NFL single-season sacks: 22.5, T. J. Watt, 2021 and Michael Strahan, 2001
 NFL career sacks: 200, Bruce Smith, 1985–2003
 NFL single-game sacks: 7, Derrick Thomas, November 11, 1990 vs. Seattle Seahawks
 NFL sacks, rookie season: 14.5, Jevon Kearse, 1999
 NFL seasons with 20.0 or more sacks: 2, J. J. Watt, 2012 & 2014
 NFL most consecutive games recording a sack: 11, Chris Jones, 2018 
 NFL most consecutive games recording a sack (team): 75, Pittsburgh Steelers, 2016–2021
 NFL career sacks taken: 557, Tom Brady, 2000–2022
 NFL single-season sacks taken: 76, David Carr, 2002
 NFL game sacks taken: 12, Warren Moon, September 29, 1985 and Donovan McNabb, September 30, 2007
 NFL Super Bowl most sacks in a single game: 12, Carolina vs. Denver, 50 (7 by Denver, 5 by Carolina)
 NFL Super Bowl most sacks by a player in a single game: 3
 Reggie White – Green Bay vs. New England, XXXI
 Darnell Dockett – Arizona vs. Pittsburgh, XLIII
 Kony Ealy – Carolina vs. Denver, 50
 Grady Jarrett – Atlanta vs. New England, LI

 NFL Super Bowl most sacks, career (sacks compiled since XVII)
 4.5, Charles Haley – 5 games San Francisco XXIII, XXIV, Dallas XXVII, XXVIII, XXX
 4.5, Von Miller – 2 games Denver 50 and Los Angeles Rams LVI

See also
 List of National Football League annual sacks leaders
 List of National Football League career sacks leaders
 The Blind Side: Evolution of a Game – non-fiction book by Michael Lewis

Notes

References

External links 

 
 Pro-football-reference.com enumeration of career sack leaders

American football terminology
Canadian football terminology

sv:Amerikansk fotboll#Sammanfattning av termer i amerikansk fotboll